is a leading English trusts law case, concerning the certainty of trusts.

Facts
Sir Adolph Tuck, a baronet who had run the art publisher Raphael Tuck & Sons, created a trust for future baronets who were married to a wife 'of Jewish blood' and who 'continues to worship according to the Jewish faith'. If in doubt, 'the decision of the Chief Rabbi in London of either the Portuguese or Anglo German Community… shall be conclusive'. It was contended that the concepts of being of Jewish faith and of Jewish blood were too uncertain for the trust to be valid.

Judgment
Lord Denning MR held the trust was valid, and the Chief Rabbi could resolve any uncertainty. The trust, however, would have been valid even if the Chief Rabbi had not been identified.

Lord Russell of Killowen agreed with Lord Denning MR, concluding with the following.

Eveleigh LJ said the trust was valid, but only because the Chief Rabbi’s opinion of who was Jewish was part of the definition of the class of beneficiaries. He felt he would not have been able to resolve an uncertain class.

See also

English trusts law

Notes

References

English trusts case law
Court of Appeal (England and Wales) cases
1977 in case law
1977 in British law
Lord Denning cases